Jordan Harrison (born 1977) is a playwright. He grew up on Bainbridge Island, Washington. His play Marjorie Prime was a finalist for the 2015 Pulitzer Prize for Drama.

Biography
Harrison received a B.A. from Stanford University in 1999 and an M.F.A. from Brown University, where he studied with Paula Vogel.  He lives in Brooklyn, New York.

Shortly after graduating from Brown, his play Kid-Simple, which he wrote while in grad school, was produced at the Actors Theatre of Louisville in 2004. The Actors Theatre of Louisville subsequently premiered his plays Act a Lady (2006) and Maple and Vine, both of which were directed by Anne Kauffman, and The Grown-Up, which was directed by Ken Rus Schmoll. Act a Lady, after being developed at the PlayPenn New Play Conference in 2005, was subsequently produced in several venues including the New Conservatory Theatre Center, San Francisco in April 2009.

The Museum Play had workshops at Brown University (2003), readings at Playwrights Horizons (2003) and Signature Theatre Company (2005) and a production at Red Eye Theatre, Minneapolis (2004). Finn in the Underworld premiered at Berkeley Repertory Theatre, California, in 2005, directed by Les Waters.

His Off-Broadway plays include Doris to Darlene (2007) and Maple and Vine at Playwrights Horizons (2011), Amazons and their Men (2008) by Clubbed Thumb at the Ohio Theatre and Futura (2010) at National Asian American Theater Company.

He wrote the book for a children's musical, The Flea and the Professor, with music composed by Richard Gray and lyrics by Harrison and Gray. The musical was commissioned by the Virginia and Harvey Kimmel Arts Education Fund of the Philadelphia Foundation and received an award from the National Endowment for the Arts. It was performed by the Arden Theatre Company, Philadelphia, Pennsylvania in May to June 2011, directed by Anne Kauffman. Suprema is a musical, with music and lyrics by Daniel Zaitchik and book and lyrics by Harrison. The musical had a reading at Ars Nova in May 2012, directed by Leigh Silverman. The musical was developed at the Eugene O'Neill Theater Center's 2011 Music Theatre Conference.

The Amateurs premiered Off-Broadway at the Vineyard Theatre on February 8, 2018 in previews and closed on March 29, 2018. Directed by Oliver Butler the play featured Kyle Beltran, Quincy Tyler Bernstine, Michael Cyril Creighton, Greg Keller, Jennifer Kim and Thomas Jay Ryan. The play was nominated for the 2018 Off Broadway Alliance Award, Best New Play and the 2018 Lucille Lortel Award, Outstanding Lead Actress in a Play (Bernstine).

His play Log Cabin premiered Off-Broadway at Playwrights Horizons on June 1, 2018 in previews, officially on June 25. The play involves a tight-knit group of gays and lesbians and is directed by Pam MacKinnon with Jesse Tyler Ferguson starring.

Harrison writes for the Netflix original series Orange Is the New Black.

Marjorie Prime 
His play Marjorie Prime premiered at the Center Theatre Group Mark Taper Forum in Los Angeles, California in September 2014, under the direction of Les Waters. The play featured Lois Smith as "Marjorie", Lisa Emery as "Tess", her daughter, Frank Wood as "Jon", Tess' husband, and Jeff Ward as "Walter", a computer-programmed, pixel-generated companion. The play had a reading at the South Coast Repertory's 
2013 Pacific Playwrights Festival on April 28, 2013, directed by Pam MacKinnon.

The play was a finalist for the 2015 Pulitzer Prize for Drama, called "a sly and surprising work about technology and artificial intelligence told through images and ideas that resonate." The 2016 Horton Foote Prize for Outstanding New American Play was awarded to Marjorie Prime. The prize includes a $20,000 monetary award. The play was nominated for the 2016 Drama League Award, for Outstanding Production Of A Broadway Or Off-Broadway Play and Distinguished Performance, Lois Smith; and the 2016 Lucille Lortel Award, Outstanding Director, Anne Kaufman.

Marjorie Prime opened Off-Broadway at Playwrights Horizons on November 20, 2015 in previews, officially on December 14, and closed on January 24, 2016, directed by Anne Kauffman. The Off-Broadway cast featured Noah Bean, Lisa Emery, Stephen Root, and Lois Smith.

The Variety reviewer noted that the play "envisions a day in the near future when we'll be able to program robots to serve as humanoid companions for the old, the infirm and the lonely. The play...is also a sensitive study of family dynamics, which makes it all the more engaging."

The play has been adapted for a film, written and directed by Michael Almereyda. The film stars Tim Robbins (Jon), Jon Hamm (Walter), Geena Davis (Tess) and Lois Smith.  Principal photography began in October 2015. The film premiered at the 2017 Sundance Film Festival (Park City, Utah) in January 2017. The film won the Sloan Feature Film Prize at the Sundance Film Festival; the prize includes a $20,000 cash award.

Artists Repertory Theatre, located in Portland, Oregon, staged the Northwest premiere of Marjorie Prime from February 7 to March 5, 2017.

Missing Link Theatre, also located in Portland, Oregon, staged a production of Marjorie Prime in September 2019.  It was directed by Donovan James, and starred Julisa Rowe, Jeff Giberson, Lani Jo Leigh, and Dan Fitzpatrick.

Style
Tim Sanford, artistic director of Playwrights Horizons said of Harrison: "He's one of the handful of exciting new writers. He creates these worlds that are—how do you describe it?—cerebral playgrounds." In an article in the Stanford Magazine, the writer noted that "Sanford isn't the only one who has trouble describing a Harrison play. Each usually starts [with] a bizarre premise." Harrison says that Tom Stoppard is an influence.

Plays and productions 
Fit for Feet (2003)
Kid-Simple (2004)
The Museum Play (2004)
Finn in the Underworld (2005)
Act a Lady (2006)
Doris to Darlene, A Cautionary Valentine (2007)
Amazons and their Men (2008)
Futura (2010)
Maple and Vine (2011)
The Flea and the Professor (2011)
Suprema (2012)
The Grown-Up (2014, Humana Festival of New American Plays)
Marjorie Prime (2014) - Finalist for the 2015 Pulitzer Prize for Drama
The Amateurs (2018)
Log Cabin (2018)

Awards and honors
His 10-minute play Fit for Feet won the Actors Theatre's Heideman Award in 2003. His children's musical, The Flea and the Professor, won the 2011 Barrymore Award for Outstanding Overall Production of a Musical (produced by the Theatre Alliance of Greater Philadelphia). Act a Lady was nominated for the 19th GLAAD Media Awards, Los Angeles Theater for 2007.

Harrison attended the Sundance Institute Playwrights Retreat at the Ucross Foundation in February 2007. He received a Kesselring Fellowship in 2007, presented by the National Arts Club. He received the Hodder Fellowship from Princeton University in 2009. He was awarded a Guggenheim Fellowship in 2009. He received the Jerome (2004) and McKnight Fellowships (2005) from The Playwrights' Center, Minneapolis, Minnesota. He won the Roe Green Award, Cleveland Play House in 2013, which included a grant of $7,500, a weeklong residency and a public reading.

Loewe Award for Musical Theater
NEA/TCG Playwright-in-Residence Grant at the Empty Space Theatre (Seattle, Washington)

Notes

References 
Profile from Playscripts, Inc.
Center Theatre Group Season Announcement

External links

American LGBT dramatists and playwrights
21st-century American dramatists and playwrights
20th-century American dramatists and playwrights
American male dramatists and playwrights
1977 births
Living people
Place of birth missing (living people)
20th-century American male writers
21st-century American male writers
Stanford University alumni
Brown University alumni